Scouts en Gidsen Vlaanderen (Scouts and Guides of Flanders) is a coeducational, Flemish Scout and Guide organisation in Belgium and is a member of the Guidisme et Scoutisme en Belgique/Gidsen- en Scoutsbeweging in België (GSB, Guides and Scouts Movement of Belgium).

The way of working of Scouts en Gidsen Vlaanderen is based on five basic principles: Joint management, Engagement, Self-activation, Service, Teamwork.

History of Flemish Catholic Scouting

1912: the Belgian Catholic Scouts‘ (BCS) was founded, later that year renamed to Baden-Powell Belgian Boy Scouts’ (BPBBS)
1913: the first Catholic Flemish group was founded in the city of Antwerp:  1ste Sint-Jacob (First Saint Jake). 
1915: the Baden-Powell Belgian Girl Scouts’ (BPBGS) was founded.
1916: the first Catholic Sea Scout group was founded in the city of Antwerp, BPBBS renamed to the Baden-Powell Belgian Boy and Sea Scouts (BPBBSS)
1929: BPBGS renamed to Association Catholiques des Guides Belges-Associatie der Katholieke Padvindsters van België (GCB-KPB)
1930: the BPBBSS split into the Dutch-speaking Vlaamsch Verbond der Katholieke Scouts (VVKS) and the French-speaking Fédération des Scouts Catholiques
1939: some guide groups left the GCB-KPB and founded, with help of the VVKS, the Katholieke Vlaamse Meisjesgidsen (KVMG), "Blue Guides", a more Flemish organisation, not recognized by the WAGGGS.
1945: the GCB-KPB changed its structure to a federation with a Dutch-speaking branch KPB and a French-speaking branch GCB 
1945-1953: some tries to rejoin KPB and KVMG as Katholieke Meisjesgidsen van België (KMGB), GCB-KPB renamed to GCB-KMGB
1959-1960: the last Blue Guides rejoin the GCB-KMGB and the GCB-KMGB split in two separate organisations: the Dutch-speaking Katholieke Meisjesgidsen van België (KMGB) and the French-speaking  Les Guides Catholiques des Belgique (GCB)
1961: KMGB renamed to Vlaams Verbond der Katholieke Meisjesgidsen (VVKM)
1973: VVKM and VVKS started merger as VVKM-VVKS
1982: VVKM and VVKS fully merged and renamed to Vlaams Verbond van Katholieke Scouts en Meisjesgidsen (VVKSM)
2006: VVKSM renamed to Scouts en Gidsen Vlaanderen (SGV).

Branches 

Giver = Gids-Verkenner

Promise
Scouts en Gidsen Vlaanderen has a progressive promise, a member uses the verse he/she understands.  The first is for Kapoenen, the last for Jins and Leaders.

Ik ben scout/ gids
Ik verken de wereld,
ik val, ik tuimel en ik sta weer op.
Ik wil mijn best doen.

Ik ben scout/gids, tussen scouts en gidsen
Daarom beloof ik
me in te zetten voor mijn groep,
want mijn werk is ploegwerk,
en onze inzet verzet bergen.

Ik ben scout/gids, tussen scouts en gidsen,
hier & nu; ginds & morgen
het spel dat we spelen is niet luchtledig.
Samen willen we de wereld verdraaien.

Ik ben scout/gids, tussen scouts en gidsen, in de wereld
zo hoop ik op iets meer dan wat ik zie.
Ik hoop dat wat ik doe niet voor niets is,
ik geloof dat wat we doen zin heeft,
ik beloof dat het niet om het even is.

See also
Scouting in Belgium
Jo Deman

External links
 Scouts en Gidsen Vlaanderen

References

World Association of Girl Guides and Girl Scouts member organizations
World Organization of the Scout Movement member organizations
Scouting and Guiding in Belgium
Youth organizations established in 1912
1912 establishments in Belgium